The 1970 Pennsylvania gubernatorial election was held on November 3. Democrat Milton Shapp challenged incumbent Republican Lieutenant Governor Ray Broderick.

Primary elections

Republican primary
Lieutenant Governor Broderick was unopposed for the Republican nomination.

Democratic primary

Candidates
 Milton Shapp of Merion, businessman and founder of Jerrold Electronics
 Bob Casey Sr. of Scranton, Pennsylvania Auditor General and former state senator
 Harvey F. Johnston of McKees Rocks, real estate broker and president of the National Association for the Advancement of White People
 Samuel G. Neff of Beaver Falls, former state senator
 Walter J. Tray of Allentown, Pennsylvania, tire dealer
 Edward P. Lavalle of Scranton, teacher

Campaign
The Democratic campaign was a bruising rematch between 1966 nominee Milton Shapp and Auditor General Bob Casey. As in the prior election, Shapp and Casey proved to be disparate personalities. The liberal and business-oriented Shapp ran an aggressive campaign into which he injected much of his own funding, while the affable Casey ran a relatively conservative campaign and appealed to labor and rural voters.

Results

Major party candidates

Democratic
Milton Shapp, CEO of Jerrold Electronics
running mate: Ernie Kline, Pennsylvania State Senate Minority Leader

Republican
Ray Broderick, Lieutenant Governor
running mate: Ralph Scalera, Beaver County Court of Common Pleas Judge

Campaign
Although Pennsylvania's Democratic establishment had not been keen on Shapp during his first run for the executive office, the support of Lieutenant Gubernatorial nominee Ernie Kline, a power broker within the party, caused support to much better coalesce behind Shapp than it had in 1966. Shapp, who is Jewish, also dealt with a lower degree of anti-Semitism during this campaign, as moderate voters were put off by the hateful messages that had been transmitted during the prior election cycle. Broderick's campaign faced an uphill battle, as he was forced to deal with the unpopularity of his boss, Governor Ray Shafer. Furthermore, Broderick was portrayed as unrealistic in his promises, as he asserted that he would not raise taxes, despite a massive state deficit. Broderick attempted to present himself as an ally of Richard Nixon and ran on a corresponding law-and-order platform; however, his tough stances often backfired, such as when outrage ensued over a Republican cartoon that depicted Shapp's liberal view as equivalent to the Viet Cong.

Shapp won victory by a huge margin. His liberalism and local base allowed him to nearly win the suburbs of Philadelphia, a GOP stronghold at the time. Furthermore, he not only performed well in conservative Central Pennsylvania, but even defeated Broderick by a considerable margin in those locales.

Results

References

1970
Pennsylvania
Gubernatorial
November 1970 events in the United States